Zhang Zhaoxu or Max Zhang (born November 18, 1987) is a Chinese basketball player, currently playing for the Tianjin Pioneers of the Chinese Basketball Association (CBA). Earlier he has played for the University of California, Berkeley, and was also a member of the Chinese national basketball team. Max features in the Youtube series 'The Shark Knight' on the Donnie Does Channel.

NCAA career
Zhang played two seasons (2008–2010) at California.  As a freshman and a sophomore, he saw action off the bench in 42 total games over two years for the Golden Bears.

Chinese national team
Zhang is also a member of the Chinese national basketball team.  He competed with the Chinese junior team at the 2009 World University Games.  After competing several times as a junior for the junior national team, he made his senior team debut at the 2010 FIBA World Championship in Turkey and competed at the 2012 Summer Olympics.

References

External links
Cal Golden Bears bio

1987 births
Living people
Asian Games gold medalists for China
Asian Games medalists in basketball
Basketball players at the 2010 Asian Games
Basketball players at the 2012 Summer Olympics
Basketball players from Shandong
Chinese men's basketball players
California Golden Bears men's basketball players
Centers (basketball)
Chinese expatriate basketball people in the United States
Olympic basketball players of China
Sportspeople from Yantai
Shanghai Sharks players
Medalists at the 2010 Asian Games
2010 FIBA World Championship players